Rajendran Ramamoorthy is a  Sri Lankan Politician. He was a member of the Parliament of Sri Lanka . He belonged to the Eelam People's Democratic Party. He however quit the EPDP after a dispute with party leader Douglas Devananda and later EPDP expelled them.

References

Members of the 10th Parliament of Sri Lanka
1967 births
Living people
Sri Lankan Hindus
Eelam People's Democratic Party politicians
Sri Lankan Tamil politicians
'